Tournament of Hearts is the third full-length album by the Constantines.  It was released September 27, 2005, on the Canadian label Three Gut Records.  Sub Pop released the album outside of Canada two weeks later, on October 11, 2005. In an interview with CBC Radio 3 to promote the release of Reunion Tour, John K. Samson, the singer/guitarist of The Weakerthans, claimed that the Constantines chose the album title at his urging.

Track listing
 "Draw Us Lines" – 4:16
 "Hotline Operator" – 3:39
 "Love in Fear" – 3:55
 "Lizaveta" – 3:34
 "Soon Enough" – 4:00
 "Working Full-Time" – 3:56
 "Good Nurse" – 3:29
 "Thieves" – 3:30
 "You Are a Conductor" – 3:59
 "Windy Road" – 2:29

References

2005 albums
Constantines albums
Sub Pop albums
Three Gut Records albums